The Outcasts of Poker Flat is a 1937 American Western film directed by Christy Cabanne and written by John Twist and Harry Segall. The film stars Preston Foster, Jean Muir, Van Heflin, Virginia Weidler and Margaret Irving. The film was released on April 16, 1937, by RKO Pictures.

The screenplay is based on the short story The Outcasts of Poker Flat by Bret Harte, which has been brought to film at least five times, including in 1919 The Outcasts of Poker Flat with Harry Carey and in 1952 The Outcasts of Poker Flat with Dale Robertson.

Plot
A gunfighter and gambler, John Oakhurst ends up caring for a baby girl whose mother dies in childbirth. He decides to call her "Luck" and looks to new schoolmarm Helen Colby and the Rev. Sam Woods to set a good example for the girl.

Luck grows up and Poker Flat grows into a boom town. One day, while John and the reverend are quarreling about the bad element that John and his partner, The Duchess, permit in their gambling house, Luck ends up playing cards with Sonoma, a vicious outlaw. A furious John explodes at Helen, feeling she was supposed to be keeping an eye on Luck at the time. Helen decides to leave town, but Luck convinces her that John loves her.

Determined to change into a better man, John refuses to be goaded into a showdown by Sonoma, at least until The Duchess taunts him, whereupon he kills Sonoma and another man. A vigilante group orders John and The Duchess out of town and Helen goes along. Their horses are stolen and, in the mountains in winter, The Duchess freezes to death. Helen nearly dies, but just as Luck rides up to rescue her, they find that John, feeling guilty for what he's done, has taken his own life.

Cast

References

External links 
 
 
 
 

1937 films
American black-and-white films
RKO Pictures films
American Western (genre) films
1937 Western (genre) films
Films directed by Christy Cabanne
Films based on works by Bret Harte
1930s English-language films
1930s American films